The 2003 NASDAQ-100 Open was a tennis tournament played on outdoor hard courts. It was the 19th edition of the Miami Masters and was part of the Tennis Masters Series of the 2003 ATP Tour and of Tier I of the 2003 WTA Tour. Both the men's and women's events took place at the Tennis Center at Crandon Park in Key Biscayne, Florida in the United States from March 17 through March 30, 2003.

Finals

Men's singles

 Andre Agassi defeated  Carlos Moyá 6–3, 6–3
 It was Agassi's 3rd title of the year and the 58th of his career. It was his 1st Masters title of the year and his 16th overall. It was his 6th title at the event having also won in 1990, 1995, 1996, 2001 and 2002.

Women's singles

 Serena Williams defeated  Jennifer Capriati 4–6, 6–4, 6–1
 It was Williams' 3rd title of the year and the 35th of her career. It was her 1st Tier I title of the year and her 6th overall. It was her 2nd title at the event after winning in 2002.

Men's doubles

 Roger Federer /  Max Mirnyi defeated  Leander Paes /  David Rikl 7–5, 6–3
 It was Federer's 3rd title of the year and the 11th of his career. It was Mirnyi's 2nd title of the year and the 15th of his career.

Women's doubles

 Liezel Huber /  Magdalena Maleeva defeated  Shinobu Asagoe /  Nana Miyagi 6–4, 3–6, 7–5
 It was Huber's 1st title of the year and the 5th of her career. It was Maleeva's 1st title of the year and the 12th of her career.

References

External links
 Official website
 ATP Tournament Profile
 WTA Tournament Profile

 
NASDAQ-100 Open
NASDAQ-100 Open
NASDAQ-100 Open
Miami Open (tennis)
NASDAQ-100 Open
NASDAQ-100 Open